Noisy-le-Roi is a commune in the Yvelines department in the Île-de-France region in north-central France.

Population

Twin towns
 Albion, Michigan, USA
 Godella, Spain, since August 2006

See also
Communes of the Yvelines department

References

Communes of Yvelines
Yvelines communes articles needing translation from French Wikipedia